Nashipur Road was a railway station of the Sealdah-Lalgola line in the Eastern Railway zone of Indian Railways. The station was situated at Nashipur in Murshidabad district in the Indian state of West Bengal. It served Nashipur and surroundings areas. Lalgola Passengers and few EMU trains used to pass through the station. After Nashipur bridge completion, this station may be functional again.

Electrification
The Krishnanagar– section, including Nashipur Road railway station was electrified in 2004. In 2010 the line became double tracked.

References

Railway stations in Murshidabad district
Sealdah railway division
Kolkata Suburban Railway stations